Ronny Goodlass (born 6 September 1953, in Liverpool) is an English footballer who played for English Premier League club Everton.

Goodlass is better known as the one handed winger as he only has one hand due to an unfortunate accident with a power tool.
He played for Everton in the old First Division. Favoured while playing for Billy Bingham, Ronny was replaced by Dave Thomas once Gordon Lee became the manager of Everton.

Highlights of his Everton career include scoring from the half-way line at West Ham and playing a major role in 1977 in the run to the final of the League Cup against Aston Villa and the semi-final of the FA Cup against local rivals Liverpool. He was the player who provided the cross for the infamous disallowed "goal" by Bryan Hamilton by controversial referee Clive Thomas that would have seen Everton through to the FA Cup final.

Post Everton

In October 1977 he moved to Dutch club, NAC Breda for £75,000. He then went on to play for ADO Den Haag before returning to play in England with Fulham. He returned to Everton once his playing career had come to an end under Joe Royle who appointed him as youth team coach. He also had a spell in charge of the now defunct Vauxhall Conference club Runcorn.

He is best known these days as the Everton and Tranmere Rovers match day summariser for BBC Radio Merseyside. He is renowned for his catchphrase: "It's one of them!"  He is well liked and respected by supporters for his honest opinion of the club's performances on and off the pitch. He is widely considered to be a fan first and a former player second. He can also be heard on the station's Friday night preview programme Blue Watch giving his opinion in "The Goodlass Guide" between 8.00pm and 8.30pm.

He is a known supporter of keeping Everton in the city of Liverpool.

Ronny now heads up his own charity called Health Through Sport which aims to improve fitness and eating habits among young people who comes from some of the most deprived and marginalised communities in Liverpool.

External links
Ronnie Goodlass, Post War English & Scottish Football League A - Z Player's Transfer Database
http://www.sporting-heroes.net/football-heroes/displayhero_club.asp?HeroID=854 - Sporting Heroes

1953 births
Living people
Footballers from Liverpool
English footballers
Everton F.C. players
Fulham F.C. players
Scunthorpe United F.C. players
Tranmere Rovers F.C. players
English Football League players
NAC Breda players
ADO Den Haag players
Seiko SA players
Barrow A.F.C. players
English expatriate footballers
Expatriate footballers in the Netherlands
Expatriate footballers in Hong Kong
Hong Kong First Division League players
Association football wingers